The Carlos Palanca Memorial Awards for Literature winners in the year 1956 (rank, title of winning entry, name of author).


English division
Short story
First prize: "The Trap" by Kerima Polotan Tuvera
Second prize: "The Transfer" by Bienvenido Santos
Third prize: "The Lost Ones" by S.V. Epistola

One-act play
First prize: "New Yorker in Tondo" by Marcelino Agana Jr.
Second prize: "Island of the Heart" by Wilfrido D. Nolledo
Third prize: "The Strike" by Isabel Taylor Escoda

Filipino (Tagalog) division
Short story in Filipino
First prize: No winner
Second prize: "Lupa, Ulan at Supling" by Martin Del Rosario
Third prize: "Mga Butil, Mga Busal" by Pedrito Salazar

One-act play in Filipino
First prize: "Karalitaan" by Ruben Vega
Second prize: "Bakas ng Kahapon" by Gregorio De Vega
Third prize: "Kidnapped" by Deogracias Tigno Jr.

More winners by year

References
 

1956
1956 literary awards